The 2016–17 season of the Bermudian Premier Division (also known as the Cingular Wireless Premier Division for sponsorship reasons) is the 54th season of top-tier football in Bermuda. It started on 25 September 2016 and will finish on 19 March 2017. Dandy Town Hornets are the defending champions, having won their 8th top tier title last season.

Changes from 2015–16

At the end of the 2015–16 season, Southampton Rangers and Hamilton Parish were relegated after finishing 9th and 10th in the competition. They were replaced by the champions and runners-up of the First Division, Somerset Eagles and Flanagan's Onions.

Teams

Table

Results

References

External links 
Bermuda FA
Soccerway
RSSSF

Bermudian Premier Division seasons
Bermuda
1